The 2017–18 USC Trojans men's basketball team represented the University of Southern California during the 2017–18 NCAA Division I men's basketball season. Led by fifth-year head coach Andy Enfield, they played their home games at the Galen Center in Los Angeles, California as members of the Pac-12 Conference. They finished the season 24–12, 12–6 in Pac-12 play to finish in second place. As the No. 2 seed in the Pac-12 tournament, they defeated Oregon State in the quarterfinals and Oregon in the semifinals before losing to Arizona in the championship game. They were one of the last four teams not selected for the NCAA tournament and as a result earned a No. 1 seed in the National Invitation Tournament, where they defeated UNC Asheville in the first round before losing to Western Kentucky in the second round.

Previous season
The Trojans finished the 2016–17 season 26–10, 10–8 in Pac-12 play to finish in a tie for fifth place; their 26 victories set a program record. They defeated Washington in the first round of the Pac-12 tournament before losing in the quarterfinals to UCLA. They received an at-large bid to the NCAA tournament where they defeated Providence in the First Four and SMU in the First Round before losing in the Second Round to Baylor.

FBI investigation

On September 26, federal prosecutors in New York announced charges of fraud and corruption against 10 people involved in college basketball, including USC assistant coach Tony Bland. The charges allege that Bland and others allegedly received benefits from financial advisers and others to influence student-athletes to retain their services. Following the announcement, USC placed Bland on administrative leave and announced that it would conduct an internal investigation of the matter. Potential 2018 NBA draft pick De'Anthony Melton would be indefinitely suspended in relation to the scandal in January before leaving USC on February 21, 2018.

Off-season

Departures

2017 recruiting class

Future recruits

Roster

Sophomore guard De'Anthony Melton was officially ruled ineligible to play for the remainder of the season by USC amid an FBI bribery investigation. He later left USC on February 21, 2018 for the 2018 NBA draft.
Feb. 16, 2018 - Sophomore forward Bennie Boatwright to miss the remainder of the season with a left leg injury.

Schedule and results

|-
!colspan=12 style="background:#; color:#;"| Non-conference regular season

|-
!colspan=12 style="background:#;"| Pac-12 regular season

|-
!colspan=12 style="background:#;"| Pac-12 Tournament

|-
!colspan=12 style="background:#;"| NIT

Ranking movement

References

USC Trojans men's basketball seasons
Usc
USC Trojans basketball, men
USC Trojans basketball, men
USC
USC Trojans basketball, men
USC Trojans basketball, men